KGAF (1580 kHz) is a commercial AM radio station broadcasting a gold-based adult contemporary radio format. Licensed to Gainesville, Texas, the station serves Cooke County. The station is owned by First IV Media, Inc. and operated by Eberhart Broadcasting.

KGAF transmits with 1,200 watts by day and 280 watts at night, using a non-directional antenna.  Programming is also heard on 250-watt FM translator K222DD on 92.3 MHz.

Station Info
KGAF is an Adult Contemporary formatted radio station in Gainesville in Cooke County Texas.
KGAF features Dee Blanton in the morning with newsperson Melanie Brown.  Middays are anchored by Janice Williams, Steve Eberhart afternoons and Johnny at night.
KGAF cover local in season sports, including Football, Basketball and Baseball playoffs.
Network news from ABC News and Texas State Network News is featured each hour.

References

External links

FCC History Cards for KGAF

GAF
Radio stations established in 1947
1947 establishments in Texas
Full service radio stations in the United States